The 2014 Norfolk State Spartans football team represented Norfolk State University in the 2014 NCAA Division I FCS football season. They were led by tenth-year head coach Pete Adrian and played their home games at William "Dick" Price Stadium. They were a member of the Mid-Eastern Athletic Conference  (MEAC). They finished the season 4–8, 4–4 in MEAC play to finish in sixth place.

On November 24, head coach  Adrian announced his retirement. He finished at Norfolk State with a ten-year record of 54–60.

Schedule

Source: Schedule

References

Norfolk State
Norfolk State Spartans football seasons
Norfolk State Spartans football